is a city in northern Kyoto Prefecture, Japan. , the city had an estimated population of 76,037 in 36412 households and a population density of 140 persons per km².

Geography 
Fukuchiyama is located in northwestern Kyoto Prefecture, bordering Hyogo Prefecture to the west. It is centered on the Fukuchiyama Basin formed by the  Yura River, and is surrounded by mountains to the south, west, and east. It is located about 70 kilometers from downtown Osaka, 60 kilometers from Kyoto or Kobe City, and about 30 kilometers from Toyooka or Maizuru. The highest elevation in the city is 839.17 meters above sea level, and the lowest is 7.11meters. The city center extends along the Yura River.

Neighbouring municipalities 
Kyoto Prefecture
 Maizuru
 Ayabe
 Miyazu
 Kyōtango
 Yosano
Hyōgo Prefecture
 Tamba
 Toyooka
 Asago
 Sasayama

Climate
Fukuchiyama has a humid subtropical climate (Köppen Cfa), featuring a marked seasonal variation in temperature and precipitation. Summers are hot and humid, but winters are relatively cold with occasional snowfall.

Demographics
Per Japanese census data, the population of Fukuchiyama has remained relatively stable over the past 60 years.

History
Fukuchiyama is part of ancient Tanba Province. From various excavated items, people have been living along the Yura River since at least the Jōmon period and the area was a  transportation hub since ancient times. In the Heian period, the Fukuchiyama basin was developed into a number of shōen landed estates by the Five regent houses in Kyoto. In the Sengoku period, the area came under the control of Akechi Mitsuhide and a castle town developed around Fukuchiyama Castle. In the Edo Period, it was the center of Fukuchiyama Domain, which was ruled by a succession of fudai daimyō. After the Meiji restoration, the town of Fukuchiyama was established on April 1, 1889 with the creation of the modern municipalities system. It was raised to city status on  April 1, 1937, becoming the third city in Kyoto Prefecture after Kyoto and Fushimi. The city borders expanded in 1936, 1949, 1955.  On January 1, 2006, the towns of Miwa and Yakuno (both from Amata District), and the town of Ōe (from Kasa District) were merged into Fukuchiyama. Amata District was abolished by this merger.

Government
Fukuchiyama has a mayor-council form of government with a directly elected mayor and a unicameral city council of 24 members. Fukuchiyama contributes two members to the Kyoto Prefectural Assembly. In terms of national politics, the city is part of the Kyoto 5th district of the lower house of the Diet of Japan.

Economy
Fukuchiyama has a mixed economy with commerce,  light manufacturing and agriculture. Traditionally, the local economy was noted for indigo dying, cotton and silk production; however, the city industrialized as a supplier of components for the military. Postwar, a number of industrial parks, notably the Osadano Industrial Park, have developed.

Education
Fukuchiyama has 19 public elementary schools and eight public middle schools and one combined elementary/middle school operated by the city government and two public high schools and one combined middle/high school operated by the Kyoto Prefectural Department of Education. There are also two private high schools and one private combined middle high school. The prefecture also operates one special education school for the handicapped. A private college, the  University of Fukuchiyama,  is located in Fukuchiyama and the Kyoto Institute of Technology has a campus in the city.

Transportation

Railway
 JR West – San'in Main Line
  -  -  -  - 
 JR West – Fukuchiyama Line
  
 Kyoto Tango Railway – Miyafuku Line
  -  -  -  -  -  -  -  -  -

Highway
Maizuru-Wakasa Expressway

Local attractions
Fukuchiyama Castle

Sports
Fukuchiyama is the birthplace of tambo rugby.

Noted people from Fukuchiyama
 Osamu Shimomura, a Nobel Prize–winning chemist
 Kenta Kobashi, a professional wrestling icon
 Sadakazu Tanigaki, Secretary-General of the LDP

References

External links

Fukuchiyama City official website
Fukuchiyama High Resolution Symbol

Cities in Kyoto Prefecture
Fukuchiyama, Kyoto